Street Smart was an Australian television comedy series that debuted on Network Ten from 5 August 2018 until 1 October 2018.

Plot
Street Smart follows the story of Steve who puts together a disorganised criminal gang out of his parents' garage in a western suburb of Sydney. He is thwarted by his nemesis and cousin Joseph, a professional parking inspector with the help of his workmate, Tia, a probationary parking officer.

Cast
 Tahir Bilgic as Steve
 Rob Shehadie as Joseph
 Neel Kolhatkar as Raj
 Dave Eastgate as Shane
 Andy Trieu as Hung
 Maria Tran as Trans Phat
 Casey Donovan as Tia
 Simon Elrahi as Adil
 Dina Gillespie as Zena 
 Neveen Hanna as Marie

Episodes

References

2018 Australian television series debuts
Network 10 original programming
Australian comedy television series